Brabos is a municipality located in the province of Ávila, Castile and León, Spain. According to the 2006 census (INE), the municipality had a population of 62 inhabitants.

Monuments
Immaculate Conception Church
Shrines of Santa María del Cerro and San Miguel de Otero
Pensioners' home
Main Square
Fountain

Customs
During festivities (either national or local patron's festivities), neighbours gather to share food.
Climbing the holy hill to take part in mass and a later procession downhill, which is attended by neighbouring townsfolk.
Merrymaking at the constitution bridge.
During the last weekend in August or the first in September the whole town partakes in a big traditional celebration.

References

Municipalities in the Province of Ávila